Jonathan Lines is an American businessman and former chairman of the Arizona Republican Party. Lines is the general manager of Lines & Lundgreen Roofing and Insulation Inc.

Personal life
Lines has 11 children. He is a member of the Church of Jesus Christ of Latter-day Saints.

Arizona Republican Party
Lines took over the party after 2016, a difficult presidential election year. While Trump won the Arizona presidential primary-preference election, the state elected almost all Cruz supporting delegates to the convention. Chairman Lines was then faced with the challenge of uniting the party before the mid-term elections.

In 2019, Lines lost re-election to former state Senator Kelli Ward.

References

Arizona Republican Party chairs
Living people
Year of birth missing (living people)
People from Yuma, Arizona
Northern Arizona University alumni